Liang Yanfeng (Chinese: 梁岩峰; Pinyin: Liáng Yánfēng; born 18 April 1987) is a Chinese football player who currently plays for China League Two side Yanbian Beiguo.

Club career
Liang joined Changsha Ginde youth team system in the early year and was promoted to first team squad in 2007. He made his league debut on 4 October 2007, in a 2–0 away defeat against Shanghai Shenhua. He became a regular player in the second half of the 2010 league season, however, Changsha Ginde finished the bottom of the league and relegation to China League One. In February 2011, the club moved to Shenzhen as the club's name changed into Shenzhen Phoenix, Liang chose to stay in the club. On 5 May, he scored his first senior goal in a 2011 Chinese FA Cup match which Shenzhen Phoenix beat Shenyang Dongjin 3–0. The club were bought by Chinese property developers Guangzhou R&F and moved to Guangzhou in June and won promotion back to the Super League at the first attempt. Liang made 15 appearances in the 2011 league season.

In July 2013, Liang was to China League Two side Shenyang Dongjin until 31 December. In July 2014, he was loaned to China League Two side Nanjing Qianbao until 31 December. In March 2015, Liang transferred to China League Two side Fujian Broncos. In March 2016, Liang transferred to China League One side Guizhou Zhicheng. On 11 January 2018, Liang transferred to China League Two side Yanbian Beiguo.

Career statistics 

Statistics accurate as of match played 12 October 2019.

References

1987 births
Living people
Chinese footballers
Association football midfielders
Footballers from Shenyang
Changsha Ginde players
Guangzhou City F.C. players
Shenyang Dongjin players
Guizhou F.C. players
Chinese Super League players
China League One players